In statistical mechanics the hypernetted-chain equation is a closure relation to solve the Ornstein–Zernike equation which relates the direct correlation function to the total correlation function. It is commonly used in fluid theory to obtain e.g. expressions for the radial distribution function. It is given by:

 

where  is the number density of molecules,   is the radial distribution function,  is the direct interaction between pairs.  with   being the Thermodynamic temperature and  the Boltzmann constant.

Derivation
The direct correlation function represents the direct correlation between two particles in a system containing N − 2 other particles. It can be represented by

 

Thus we approximate  by

 

 

This equation is the essence of the hypernetted chain equation. We can equivalently write

 

If we substitute this result in the Ornstein–Zernike equation

one obtains the hypernetted-chain equation:

See also
Classical-map hypernetted-chain method
Percus–Yevick approximation – another closure relation
Ornstein–Zernike equation

Statistical mechanics